The 2021–22 Troy Trojans men's basketball team represented Troy University in the 2021–22 NCAA Division I men's basketball season. The Trojans, led by third-year head coach Scott Cross, played their home games at Trojan Arena in Troy, Alabama as members of the Sun Belt Conference. They finished the season 20–12, 10–6 in SBC play to finish in fourth place. They defeated Little Rock in the quarterfinals of the SBC tournament before losing to Louisiana in the semifinals. They received an invitation to the College Basketball Invitational where they lost to Abilene Christian in the first round.

Previous season
In a season limited due to the ongoing COVID-19 pandemic, the Trojans finished the 2020–21 season 11–17, 4–12 in Sun Belt play to finish in sixth place in the East Division.

Roster

Schedule and results

|-
!colspan=12 style=| Non-conference regular season

|-
!colspan=12 style=| Sun Belt regular season

|-
!colspan=12 style=| Sun Belt tournament

|-
!colspan=9 style=| CBI

Source

References

Troy Trojans men's basketball seasons
Troy
Troy
Troy Trojans men's basketball
Troy Trojans men's basketball